James Pritchard (born April 28, 1961 in Louisville, Kentucky) is an American former professional boxer who competed from 1985 to 1997. He challenged once for the IBF cruiserweight title in 1991.

Amateur
Pritchard had a stellar amateur career, becoming the 1985 National Golden Gloves Super Heavyweight Champion.

Professional career
Pritchard turned pro in 1985 and went undefeated in 17 bouts, including a draw with Mike 'The Bounty' Hunter, before facing ex-world heavyweight champion Mike Weaver in a crossroads fight. Pritchard was stopped by the big punching Weaver on his feet in six, but returned to win three fights in a row before meeting another former world champion, this time Michael Dokes. Pritchard was stopped in seven, but gained a reputation for toughness as Dokes, like Weaver, could not drop Pritchard.

Pritchard travelled to apartheid South Africa for several fights, boxing to a controversial draw with Johnny DuPlooy when he had apparently got the better of DuPlooy. He was stopped in 10 in a rematch, then stopped in eight by DuPlooy's rival Pierre Coetzer. Pritchard returned to the States where he was a chief sparring partner of Frank Bruno prior to his Tyson fight. He also put together a string of wins including a KO of novice Lionel Butler. A trip to England to face world ranked Gary Mason resulted in a 9th round stoppage loss, although yet again Pritchard gained respect for his durability - no one could knock him down.

World title fight
Having been relegated to opponent status in the heavyweights, the 26-5-2 Pritchard moved down to the Cruiserweight division. He beat two-time world title challenger Siza Makathini in his debut winning an IBF Intercontinental title, but in his 1991 fight with James Warring for the vacant IBF cruiserweight title he was dropped for the first time in his career and stopped in 36 seconds, a record for a world title fight.

Journeyman
Pritchard returned to the heavyweights after his cruiserweight title disaster, but was relegated to journeyman status. He knocked out undefeated West Turner to win the USBA heavyweight title, but lost to the likes of Tim Witherspoon, Orlin Norris, Michael Moorer and Herbie Hide.

By the mid to late 1990s he was an aged heavyweight and not much more than cannon fodder for Corrie Sanders, Brian Nielsen and Wladimir Klitschko. He retired in 1997 with a respectable record of 30-18-2 (25 KOs).

Professional boxing record

|-
|align="center" colspan=8|30 Wins (25 knockouts, 5 decisions), 18 Losses (12 knockouts, 6 decisions), 2 Draws 
|-
| align="center" style="border-style: none none solid solid; background: #e3e3e3"|Result
| align="center" style="border-style: none none solid solid; background: #e3e3e3"|Record
| align="center" style="border-style: none none solid solid; background: #e3e3e3"|Opponent
| align="center" style="border-style: none none solid solid; background: #e3e3e3"|Type
| align="center" style="border-style: none none solid solid; background: #e3e3e3"|Round
| align="center" style="border-style: none none solid solid; background: #e3e3e3"|Date
| align="center" style="border-style: none none solid solid; background: #e3e3e3"|Location
| align="center" style="border-style: none none solid solid; background: #e3e3e3"|Notes
|-align=center
|Loss
|30–18–2
|align=left| Darroll Wilson
|TKO
|align=left|2
|29/11/1997
|align=left| Vineland, New Jersey, U.S.
|align=left|
|-
|Loss
|30–17–2
|align=left| Wladimir Klitschko
|TKO
|3
|20/09/1997
|align=left| Aachen, Germany
|align=left|
|-
|Loss
|30–16–2
|align=left| Damon Reed
|UD
|10
|11/08/1997
|align=left| Kansas City, Missouri, U.S.
|align=left|
|-
|Loss
|30–15–2
|align=left| Brian Nielsen (boxer)
|KO
|3
|13/06/1997
|align=left| Slagelse, Denmark
|align=left|
|-
|Win
|30–14–2
|align=left| Greg Suttington
|TKO
|4
|13/05/1996
|align=left| Kansas City, Missouri, U.S.
|align=left|
|-
|Loss
|29–14–2
|align=left| Corrie Sanders
|TKO
|1
|05/08/1995
|align=left| Albuquerque, New Mexico, U.S.
|align=left|
|-
|Loss
|29–13–2
|align=left| Brian Morgan
|SD
|8
|20/03/1995
|align=left| Louisville, Kentucky, U.S.
|align=left|
|-
|Win
|29–12–2
|align=left| Ralph Jackson
|TKO
|3
|13/02/1995
|align=left| Louisville, Kentucky, U.S.
|align=left|
|-
|Loss
|28–12–2
|align=left| Zeljko Mavrovic
|UD
|10
|18/06/1994
|align=left| Chicago, Illinois, U.S.
|align=left|
|-
|Loss
|28–11–2
|align=left| Kenny Keene
|PTS
|10
|05/12/1993
|align=left| Caldwell, Idaho, U.S.
|align=left|
|-
|Loss
|28–10–2
|align=left| Michael Moorer
|TKO
|3
|22/06/1993
|align=left| Atlantic City, New Jersey, U.S.
|align=left|
|-
|Loss
|28–9–2
|align=left| Herbie Hide
|TKO
|2
|12/12/1992
|align=left| London, England
|align=left|
|-
|Win
|28–8–2
|align=left| West Turner
|TKO
|3
|10/07/1992
|align=left| Ringgold Township, Pennsylvania, U.S.
|align=left|
|-
|Loss
|27–8–2
|align=left| Tim Witherspoon
|UD
|10
|23/03/1992
|align=left| Atlantic City, New Jersey, U.S.
|align=left|
|-
|Loss
|27–7–2
|align=left| Orlin Norris
|PTS
|8
|13/12/1991
|align=left| Bercy, France
|align=left|
|-
|Loss
|27–6–2
|align=left| James Warring
|KO
|1
|07/09/1991
|align=left| Salemi, Italy
|align=left|
|-
|Win
|27–5–2
|align=left| Siza Makathini
|DQ
|6
|06/04/1991
|align=left| Darlington, England
|align=left|
|-
|Loss
|26–5–2
|align=left| Gary Mason (boxer)
|TKO
|9
|12/12/1990
|align=left| London, England
|align=left|
|-
|Win
|26–4–2
|align=left| Rick Enis
|TKO
|8
|28/07/1990
|align=left| Saint Petersburg, Florida, U.S.
|align=left|
|-
|Win
|25–4–2
|align=left| Lorenzo Boyd
|KO
|4
|01/06/1990
|align=left| Biloxi, Mississippi, U.S.
|align=left|
|-
|Win
|24–4–2
|align=left| Ladislao Mijangos
|TKO
|6
|08/05/1990
|align=left| Lexington, Kentucky, U.S.
|align=left|
|-
|Win
|23–4–2
|align=left| Lee Moore
|TKO
|2
|02/03/1990
|align=left| Jackson, Mississippi, U.S.
|align=left|
|-
|Win
|22–4–2
|align=left| Lionel Butler
|TKO
|6
|09/12/1989
|align=left| Biloxi, Mississippi, U.S.
|align=left|
|-
|Win
|21–4–2
|align=left| Rodney Bolden
|KO
|1
|26/08/1989
|align=left| Murray, Kentucky, U.S.
|align=left|
|-
|Win
|20–4–2
|align=left| Larry Givens
|TKO
|2
|25/05/1989
|align=left| Louisville, Kentucky, U.S.
|align=left|
|-
|Win
|19–4–2
|align=left| Mike Russell
|KO
|5
|25/04/1989
|align=left| Louisville, Kentucky, U.S.
|align=left|
|-
|Loss
|18–4–2
|align=left| Pierre Coetzer
|TKO
|8
|18/03/1989
|align=left| Johannesburg, South Africa
|align=left|
|-
|Loss
|18–3–2
|align=left| Johnny DuPlooy
|TKO
|10
|22/10/1988
|align=left| Sun City, Bophuthatswana
|align=left|
|-
|Draw
|18–2–2
|align=left| Johnny DuPlooy
|PTS
|10
|02/07/1988
|align=left| Sun City, Bophuthatswana
|align=left|
|-
|Loss
|18–2–1
|align=left| Michael Dokes
|TKO
|7
|28/04/1988
|align=left| New York City, U.S.
|align=left|
|-
|Win
|18–1–1
|align=left| Steve Zouski
|TKO
|4
|25/03/1988
|align=left| Melrose Park, Illinois, U.S.
|align=left|
|-
|Win
|17–1–1
|align=left| Mike Cohen
|KO
|3
|21/02/1988
|align=left| Frankfort, Kentucky, U.S.
|align=left|
|-
|Win
|16–1–1
|align=left| Bruce Johnson
|KO
|5
|05/01/1988
|align=left| Lexington, Kentucky, U.S.
|align=left|
|-
|Loss
|15–1–1
|align=left| Mike Weaver (boxer)
|TKO
|6
|24/08/1987
|align=left| Louisville, Kentucky, U.S.
|align=left|
|-
|Win
|15–0–1
|align=left| Frankie Hines
|KO
|2
|28/07/1987
|align=left| Lexington, Kentucky, U.S.
|align=left|
|-
|Win
|14–0–1
|align=left| Kevin Casimier
|TKO
|7
|20/04/1987
|align=left| Lexington, Kentucky, U.S.
|align=left|
|-
|Win
|13–0–1
|align=left| Darryl Peppers
|TKO
|2
|17/03/1987
|align=left| Lexington, Kentucky, U.S.
|align=left|
|-
|Win
|12–0–1
|align=left| Larry Phelps
|TKO
|2
|24/02/1987
|align=left| Lexington, Kentucky, U.S.
|align=left|
|-
|Draw
|11–0–1
|align=left| Mike Hunter (boxer)
|PTS
|6
|20/02/1987
|align=left| Atlantic City, New Jersey, U.S.
|align=left|
|-
|Win
|11–0
|align=left| Bobby Crabtree
|TKO
|2
|25/11/1986
|align=left| Louisville, Kentucky, U.S.
|align=left|
|-
|Win
|10–0
|align=left| Warren Thompson (boxer)
|PTS
|6
|31/10/1986
|align=left| Atlantic City, New Jersey, U.S.
|align=left|
|-
|Win
|9–0
|align=left| Michael Johnson
|KO
|1
|03/10/1986
|align=left| Louisville, Kentucky, U.S.
|align=left|
|-
|Win
|8–0
|align=left| Robert Evans
|PTS
|6
|28/08/1986
|align=left| New York City, U.S.
|align=left|
|-
|Win
|7–0
|align=left| Melvin Epps
|UD
|6
|29/07/1986
|align=left| Lexington, Kentucky, U.S.
|align=left|
|-
|Win
|6–0
|align=left|Louis Brooks
|TKO
|1
|10/07/1986
|align=left| Houston, Texas, U.S.
|align=left|
|-
|Win
|5–0
|align=left| Tim Miller
|KO
|2
|24/06/1986
|align=left| Lexington, Kentucky, U.S.
|align=left|
|-
|Win
|4–0
|align=left| John Morton
|TKO
|1
|25/04/1986
|align=left| Louisville, Kentucky, U.S.
|align=left|
|-
|Win
|3–0
|align=left| Allen Hudson
|KO
|4
|22/03/1986
|align=left| Las Vegas, Nevada, U.S.
|align=left|
|-
|Win
|2–0
|align=left| Jack Jackson
|UD
|4
|17/01/1986
|align=left| Atlanta, Georgia, U.S.
|align=left|
|-
|Win
|1–0
|align=left| Vince Parker
|KO
|2
|21/09/1985
|align=left| Las Vegas, Nevada, U.S.
|align=left|

Criminal record

Pritchard has been imprisoned on two separate occasions in the Kentucky state prison system, both times for robbery. He was sentenced to 10 years in 1982, paroled the following year, and released from parole in 1991. He was sentenced to 20 years in 2003 and released on parole in 2009. As of January 5, 2012 he was back in jail for parole violations following a guilty plea to a theft case to which a relative, Glenn Pritchard, was a co-defendant.

External links

References

1961 births
Heavyweight boxers
Living people
National Golden Gloves champions
Boxers from Louisville, Kentucky
American male boxers